Starobesheve is an urban-type settlement in the Kalmiuske Raion of Donetsk Oblast in Ukraine. It is the administrative center of Starobesheve Raion. Population: , .

History
Starobeshevo was founded in 1779 as a selo of Beshevo by Greek settlers who moved from the settlement of Beshevo in Crimea, hence the name. During much of the 19th century, it belonged to Alexandrovsky Uyezd of Yekaterinoslav Governorate. In 1874, it was transferred to Mariupolsky Uyezd of the same governorate. After 1866, it was the administrative center of Beshevskaya Volost. In 1896, Beshevo was renamed Starobeshevo (Starobesheve, literally, Old Beshevo). In the beginning of the 20th century, the population of Beshevo was about 4000.

Following the October Revolution, Soviet power was established in Starobesheve in January 1918. Between April and November the selo was occupied by German troops, and subsequently between December 1918 and May 1919 by the White Army. In May 1919, the Red Army occupied the locality. In the meantime, in January 1919 Ukrainian Soviet Socialist Republic was established and Mariupolsky Uyezd was formally included in the republic, along with Starobesheve. In April 1920, the uyezd was transferred to the newly established Donetsk Governorate. On March 7, 1923 Styla Raion was established with its administrative center in the selo of Styla. Starobesheve was included in the raion. In November 1924, Starobesheve became the administrative center of the raion, and the raion was renamed Starobesheve. On October 1, 1925 Donetsk Governorate was abolished, and Starobesheve was included in the newly established Mariupol Okruha, one of the okruhas into which Ukraine was divided. On July 2, 1932 Starobesheve was included in Donetsk Oblast. In 1936, the okruhas were abolished, and the raions were subordinated directly to the oblast. During World War II, Starobesheve was occupied by German troops between October 1941 and September 1943.

In 2014, during the War in Donbas, Starobesheve changed hands several times. Finally, it became controlled by the self-proclaimed  Donetsk People's Republic.

Economy

Transportation
Starobesheve is connected by road with Donetsk, with Novoazovsk and Mariupol via Telmanove, with Dokuchaievsk via Styla, with Amvrosiivka via Kuteinikove, with Novyi Svit, and with Mospyne.

Culture and recreation
Pasha Angelina, one of the first female tractor operators, was born and lived in Starobesheve and worked in the local kolkhoz. A memorial museum was open in the settlement.

People from Starobesheve 
 Pasha Angelina (1912–1959), celebrated Soviet udarnik, a symbol of the technically educated female Soviet worker

References

Mariupolsky Uyezd
Urban-type settlements in Kalmiuske Raion